Carex truncatigluma is a tussock-forming species of perennial sedge in the family Cyperaceae. It is native to parts of South East Asia.

See also
List of Carex species

References

truncatigluma
Plants described in 1904
Taxa named by Charles Baron Clarke
Flora of China
Flora of Hainan
Flora of Peninsular Malaysia
Flora of the Philippines
Flora of Taiwan
Flora of Vietnam